The hermits are tropical and subtropical hummingbirds in the subfamily Phaethornithinae, comprising 37 species in six genera. They occur from southern Mexico, through Central America, to South America as far south as northern Argentina.

Their plumage typically involves greens, browns, rufous or grey. Most species show some green or bronze iridescence to the upperparts, but this is far less conspicuous than that of many other hummingbirds. The male and female plumages of hermits are very similar, with differences limited to details of bill-shape, tail-shape and/or strength of colours/patterns. Most species of hermit do not show the strong sexual dimorphism usually associated with hummingbirds; green hermit is an exception to this rule.

Hermits in the type genus, Phaethornis, have a long decurved bill (except for three species, P. koepkeae, P. philippii and P. bourcieri, with virtually straight bills) with a red or yellow base to the lower mandible, and their two central tail feathers are elongated and tipped with white, buff or ochre. The crown of the head is flat, and two pale facial stripes enclose a dusky mask.

Most hermits are restricted to the edge and undergrowth of forest, woodland and second growth, but some species (e.g. the planalto hermit) also occur in more open habitats.

Many species of hermits form leks and congregate on traditional display grounds, where females visit to choose a mate. Male hermits are generally less aggressive than other male hummingbirds, although both sexes will defend a feeding territory.

Most hermits are associated with heliconias, but will utilize other nectar sources (flowers of Centropogon, Passiflora, Costus, etc.). To a lesser degree, they will capture small arthropods. The long, decurved bills typical of this group of hummingbirds are an adaptation to certain flowers. This is taken to an extreme in the two sicklebills (Eutoxeres spp.) with their very decurved bills. Many species, including the rufous-breasted hermit, also use the heliconias for nesting, attaching their conical nest to the underside of one of the plant's broad leaves.

The taxonomy of some groups has changed significantly in recent years. Apart from those issues discussed at Phaethornis, a taxonomic problem occurs with the Threnetes leucurus/T. niger complex. Schuchmann & Hinkelmann (1999) considered the sooty barbthroat a melanistic variant of the T. leucurus, but as it was described first, its scientific name was adopted for the entire species; pale-tailed barbthroat (T. niger). This, however, has not been accepted by all authorities, notably SACC, which consider both T. niger and T. leucurus as valid species. Additionally, Mallet-Rodrigues (2006) suggested the taxon loehkeni should be considered a valid species, the bronze-tailed barbthroat.

Three additional species, the tooth-billed hummingbird (Androdon aequatorialis), the green-fronted lancebill (Doryfera ludovicae) and the blue-fronted lancebill (D. johannae), have been included in this subfamily in the past, but are now placed in Trochilinae.

Species in taxonomic order

References 

 Schuchmann, K. L. (1999). Family Trochilidae (Hummingbirds). pp. 468–680 in: del Hoyo, J., Elliott, A. & Sargatal, J. (editors) (1999): Handbook of Birds of the World, Volume 5: Barn-owls to Hummingbirds. Lynx Edicions, Barcelona.  

 Stiles, F. Gary; Skutch, Alexander Frank (1989): A guide to the birds of Costa Rica. Comistock, Ithaca. 
 Remsen, J. V., Jr., C. D. Cadena, A. Jaramillo, M. Nores, J. F. Pacheco, M. B. Robbins, T. S. Schulenberg, F. G. Stiles, D. F. Stotz, and K. J. Zimmer. Version 04-07-2007. A classification of the bird species of South America. American Ornithologists' Union.
 Split Threnetes leucurus from Threnetes niger South American Classification Committee (2003).
 Abandon the Hinkelmann-Schuchmann classification of the hermit hummingbirds (Phaethorninae), and specifically their classification of the Phaethornis superciliosus-malaris-longirostris species group South American Classification Committee (2005).
 Hinkelmann, C. (1996). Systematics and geographic variation in long-tailed hermit hummingbirds, the Phaethornis superciliosus-malaris-longirostris species group (Trochilidae), with notes on their biogeography. Ornitologia Neotropical 7(2): 119–148. PDF available
 Hinkelmann, C., and K. Schuchmann (1997). Phylogeny of the hermit hummingbirds (Trochilidae: Phaethornithinae). Studies on Neotropical Fauna and Environment. 32: 142–163.
 Mallet-Rodrigues, Francisco (2006). Táxons de aves de validade questionável com ocorrência no Brasil. III - Trochilidae (I). Revista Brasileira de Ornitologia 14(4): 475–479. PDF available